Robert Zika (born 13 April 1930) is a Swiss sprint canoeist who competed in the early 1960s. At the 1960 Summer Olympics in Rome, he was eliminated in the repechages in both the K-1 4 × 500 m and the K-2 1000 m events.

References
Robert Zika's profile at Sports Reference.com

External links

1930 births
Canoeists at the 1960 Summer Olympics
Olympic canoeists of Switzerland
Possibly living people
Swiss male canoeists